Stories of the Sahara is an autobiographical account of the life and love of the Taiwanese author Sanmao while she was living in the Sahara Desert with her Spanish husband Jose Maria Quero y Ruiz. It was first published in book form in 1976, although some of the earlier stories were published in Taiwan's United Daily News as early as 1974. 

In the work, she describes her encounters and neighbourly relationships with the Sahrawis, the local indigenous people of Western Sahara amongst whom she and her husband lived in close proximity; her adventures in exploring the Saharan desert; and her relationship with her husband, whom she married in 1973 in Western Sahara after successfully progressing through protracted bureaucratic red-tape with the colonial Spanish authorities.

Stories of the Sahara is San Mao's first published collection of stories. Part travelogue, part memoir and a valentine to her love with her husband in a foreign land, it quickly established Sanmao as a travel writer with a unique voice and perspective.  It was met with immediate success, and reprinted four times within a month and a half of its first print-run. It remains extremely popular with Chinese readers across Taiwan, Mainland China and Hong Kong.

In a study on the wave of enthusiasm for Taiwanese music and literature that swept the mainland in the 1980s, Hongwei Lu notes that "San Mao’s travel accounts of foreign cultures and life experiences gathered through her living and studying abroad provided post-Mao China with a taste of multiculturalism, and suggested the possibility of not only an expanded consciousness of the world, but a transformation of the way people think about the world and the possibility of being part of it."

References 

Travel autobiographies
1976 non-fiction books
Books about the Sahara
Taiwanese non-fiction literature
Works about Western Sahara
Chinese-language books
Works originally published in newspapers
Bloomsbury Publishing books
Travel books
Works about the Spanish Empire